Fond du Lac Band of Lake Superior Chippewa (or Wayekwaa-gichigamiing Gichigamiwininiwag in the Ojibwe language, meaning "Lake Superior Men at the far end of the Great Lake") is an Anishinaabe (Ojibwe) band located near Cloquet, Minnesota. Their land base is the Fond du Lac Indian Reservation (Ojibwe language: Nagaajiwanaang), located mainly in Carlton and Saint Louis Counties, Minnesota, 20 miles west of Duluth.

The Fond du Lac Ojibwe are one of six bands who comprise the federally recognized Minnesota Chippewa Tribe, which was organized in 1934 with a new constitution under the Indian Reorganization Act. In July 2007, their enrolled members numbered 4,044.

History

The Fond du Lac Band of Lake Superior Chippewa originally inhabited the area along the lower courses of the Saint Louis River, where the present-day cities of Duluth, Minnesota and Superior, Wisconsin developed. The Wayekwaa-gichigamiing controlled the river access to both the Saint Louis and the Nemadji River rivers, major trade-routes during the decades of the fur trade with European traders. In the same area is Spirit Island of the "Sixth Stopping Place", one of the former seven Anishinaabe administrative centers.

The Fond du Lac Band's regional economic influence helped establish the American Fur Company's trading post in what now is the Fond du Lac neighborhood of Duluth.  Two different Treaties of Fond du Lac were signed by the Fond du Lac Band.

In December 1861 a special Indian interpreter in Bayfield organized a trip to Washington D.C. for nine Chippewa Chiefs to meet President Lincoln.  The Fond Du Lac band sent two, Chief Naw-Gaw-Nub (he sits ahead) and Chief O-be-quot (Firm).  Lincoln gave all a President's Medal with his image dated 1862.  There exists a photo of the delegation attributed to Matthew Brady with Chief Naw-Gaw-Nub seated center.
There are multiple spellings for Chief Naw-Gaw-Nub's name owing to Americans having difficulty pronouncing the Ojibwe language: Naaganab, Naw-Gaw-Nab, Na-Gon-Nub or Na-Gon-Ab.

On September 2 1862 a letter was sent from the Fond Du Lac St. Louis Reservation to Governor Alexander Ramsey.  Chief Naw-Gaw-Nub and Chief Shin-Gwack (Zhin-gob) requested that the Governor relay to Lincoln that the Fond du Lac Chippewa wanted to help with the Sioux Uprising.  They understood that Lincoln needed Minnesotans to fight the south and they "begged" that the Chippewa be offered the opportunity to "help put down the evil spirit of their old enemy" who had "murdered men, women, and children."  All they asked was "that the weapons be provided and that their family's be taken care of while they were gone".  They also offered to accept a "white" commander as long as they were allowed to use traditional Chippewa methods in battle".  The letter made the newspapers in St Paul on September 13 and 19, 1862, the New York Times the next day, the Chicago Times two days later.and in Washington D.C. 
 
 
 
 
 

 
A few days later the Head Chief of the Mille Lacs Band took 700-750 warriors made the same offer at Fort Ripley and offered to defend the fort from a rumored attack by Hole in the Day.

Demographics 

The largest community on the reservation is the city of Cloquet, of which only the sparsely populated western half of the city is on reservation land. As of 2000, that part has a population of 1,204 persons out of the city's total of 11,201. The only community completely on the reservation is Brookston, at the reservation's northern end.

Economy
The Band operates two casinos, the Fond du Luth Casino in Duluth and the Black Bear Casino Resort on the reservation.  An agreement signed with the City of Duluth, in which property with-in city limits was given to the tribe to build the Fond du Luth Casino in return for profit sharing $6 million, approximately 20%, from slot machine gross revenue, was agreed upon in 1994. Profits are no longer shared with the city due to violation of the Indian Gaming Regulatory Act. The band has prevailed in court.

On August 31, 2018, the Band reached an agreement to let Enbridge build its Line 3 replacement pipeline across the Reservation. The agreement extended Enbridge's rights of way on the Reservation by 10 years, to 2039. The financial terms of the agreement were not disclosed.

The arrival of twelve American bison was celebrated in November 2022 which had been absent from the reservation since they nearly went extinct in the late 1800s. The Nature Conservancy provided the animals, known scientifically as bison, to a native-owned and operated business from one of their preserves in Nebraska with transportation assistance from the Tanka Fund. They were welcomed with a prayer, a song, and a community meal as buffalo have a cultural and a spiritual connection to indigenous communities. The Conservancy and the Tanka Fund support an effort to enrich Native lives with the re-establishment of a sustainable buffalo economy.

Government
The revised Constitution and By-Laws of the Minnesota Chippewa Tribe were approved by the Secretary of Interior on March 3, 1964. The governing body of the Fond du Lac Indian Reservation is the Reservation Business Committee, which is composed of a Chairman, Secretary-Treasurer, and three Representatives: one from District I (Cloquet), one from District II (Sawyer) and one from District III (Brookston). All are elected to four-year terms on a staggered basis, with the Chairman and Secretary-Treasurer also serving as members of the Executive Committee of the Minnesota Chippewa Tribe.

The current members of the Reservation Business Committee are:
 Chairman: Kevin Dupuis Sr.
 Secretary/Treasurer: Ferdinand Martineau Jr.
 District-I Representative: Wally Dupuis
 District-II Representative: Bruce Savage
 District-III Representative: Roger Smith

Fond du Lac Band of Lake Superior Chippewa is one of six members of the Minnesota Chippewa Tribe (MCT), from which it receives certain administrative services and support. The tribal government issues its own license plates.  In the 2020 United States Census, the reservation recorded a population of 4,184 people and in July, 2007, MCT reported 4,044 people enrolled through Fond du Lac.

Notable members
 William Houle - Chairman of the Fond du Lac Band from 1974–1988
 Jim Northrup - Author, and "Fond du Lac Follies" columnist
 Thomas David Petite - Inventor
 Joe Pappio - Professional Football Player Chicago Cardinals, Oorang Indians (Jim Thorpe Coach) also played college football at Haskell Indian Nations University.

See also
Minnesota Indian Affairs Council

References

External links
 Fond du Lac Band of Lake Superior Chippewa - Official tribal government website
 Bemaadizing: An Interdisciplinary Journal of Indigenous Life (An online journal)

 
Ojibwe in Minnesota
Ojibwe governments
Native American tribes in Minnesota
Native American tribes in Wisconsin
Carlton County, Minnesota
St. Louis County, Minnesota
Douglas County, Wisconsin

ca:Fond du Lac